Jaroslav Marvan (11 December 1901 – 21 May 1974) was a Czech actor. He was born in Prague. He was married since the 1920s with Marie Marvanová and had a daughter (Alena Marvanová) with Alena Jančaříková.

He passed his school-leaving exam in 1919 and became a member of the Central Office of posts. He was sent to Uzghorod on business matters (1920–1923).

He was a member of Vlasta Burian's Theatre 1926–1943, then of the Vinohradské divadlo (1943–1950) and then of the Městská divadla pražská (1950–1954), from where he became a member of the Národní divadlo (National Theatre), where he served for until two years before his death, in 1972.

Roles

Silent film era
His first roles in the silent film era include partaking in the following films:

 Dobrý voják Švejk
 Falešná kočička
 Pantáta Bezoušek
 Lásky Kačenky Strnadové
 Švejk v ruském zajetí
 Páter Vojtěch
 Modrý démant
 Svatý Václav 
 Plukovník Švec

Sound film era
Afterwards, in the sound era, he worked exclusively with Burian, in the following films:

 C. a k. polní maršálek
 To neznáte Hadimršku
 Funebrák
 Anton Špelec, ostrostřelec
 Pobočník Jeho Výsosti
 Revizor
 Hrdinný kapitán Korkorán
 Nezlobte dědečka
 Hrdina jedné noci
 Tři vejce do skla
 Ducháček to zařídí
 U pokladny stál...
 Ulice zpívá
 Katakomby
 Baron Prášil
 Přednosta stanice
 Provdám svou ženu
 Ryba na suchu
 Zlaté dno

His most famous roles without Burian are roles of professors in the movies Cesta do hlubin študákovy duše (1939) and Škola, základ života (1938) and the role of tram inspector Anděl in the movies Dovolená s Andělem (1952), Anděl na horách (1955), (though both movies include heavy pro communist propaganda, like showing the ideal union of workers at a workers summer resort, where they all rather work together on a kindergarten building then vacation).

Books
He died in 1974 in Prague, with his three books of memorials being published posthumously. These include:

 „Nejen o sobě“ ("About not only my/himself") (1975)
 „Jaroslav Marvan vypravuje“ ("Jaroslav Marvan relates") (1975)
 „Herecké eso“ ("Ace Actor") (1995)

External links 
 Jaroslav Marvan in Czech National Theater Archive
 
 FDb.cz - Jaroslav Marvan (in Czech)
 ČSFD.cz - Jaroslav Marvan (in Czech) 

1901 births
1974 deaths
Male actors from Prague
People from the Kingdom of Bohemia
Czech male film actors
Czech male silent film actors
20th-century Czech male actors
Burials at Vyšehrad Cemetery
Czech male stage actors